Lichtenwald is a town in the district of Esslingen in Baden-Württemberg in southern Germany.

References

Esslingen (district)